Bernard Maurice Blake Jr. (born February 29, 1992) is a former American football cornerback. He played college football at Colorado State. Blake was signed by the Green Bay Packers as an undrafted free agent in 2015, before a latent brain aneurysm caused his release.

Professional career

After going undrafted in the 2015 NFL Draft, Blake signed with the Green Bay Packers on May 8, 2015. He was released by the Packers on July 24, 2015 due to suffering a latent intracranial aneurysm.

Personal life 
After the end of his football career, Blake founded a positional football training company in Austin, Texas.

References

External links
 Colorado State Rams bio
 

1992 births
Living people
Players of American football from Austin, Texas
American football cornerbacks
Colorado State Rams football players
Green Bay Packers players